The United Nations Temporary Executive Authority (UNTEA) and the United Nations Security Force (UNSF) in West New Guinea was established during October 1962 in accord with General Assembly Resolution 1752 as requested in Article two of the New York Agreement to administer the former Dutch New Guinea. The UNTEA administration ended on 1 May 1963.

This was the first time in its history that the United Nations assumed direct administrative responsibility for a territory (as opposed to monitoring or supervising). The UN was responsible for promoting and safeguarding human rights at the national level. The United Nations would go on to undertake similar missions in Cambodia (UNTAC), Croatia (UNTAES), Kosovo (UNMIK) and East Timor (UNTAET).

History
Western New Guinea became the focus of a political dispute between the Netherlands and Indonesia following the recognition of the independence of the latter. The Indonesian side claimed the territory as its own while the Dutch side maintained that its residents were not Indonesian and that the Netherlands would continue to administer the territory until it was capable of self-determination.

In May 1959 a United States diplomat proposed a scheme for using a "a special United Nations trusteeship over the territory for a limited number of years, at the end of which time sovereignty would be turned over to Indonesia"; and in March 1961 the U.S. Embassy in Jakarta asserted "the Indos once contended that UN trusteeship would be anathema under any circumstances. Now, although they have not gone so far as to be willing to call a trusteeship a trusteeship, they talk in terms of "one or two years" of some kind of interregnum as being acceptable."

Indonesia began landing paratroops onto the territory of Western New Guinea in December 1961 which prompted a political crisis between the Netherlands and Indonesia. The United States mediated in the dispute and this led to the signing of the New York Agreement in September 1962.

The agreement offered to transfer the administration from the Netherlands to a United Nations temporary authority on 1 October 1962, and gave the United Nations a discretion to transfer all or part of the administration to Indonesia. The United Nations General Assembly approved the agreement and accepted administration on 21 September 1962 in General Assembly resolution 1752; and on 1 May the following year accept transferred the administration of the territory to Indonesia. The agreement also included assurances by Indonesia of the practices it would exercise if the United Nations chose to transfer the administration to Indonesia, among the assurances was promise that all men and women of West New Guinea who were not foreign nationals would be eligible to vote in an Act of Free Choice at a later stage to determine the permanent status of the territory.

During the seven month transition period Dutch civil servants and officials were slowly recalled to the Netherlands and were replaced by local and Indonesian officials.  It was agreed that following the transfer of authority Elias Jan Bonai, a member of the New Guinea Council, would be appointed as the first Indonesian Governor.

The transfer of authority took place on 1 May 1963 and West New Guinea became a province of Indonesia known as West Irian (Irian Barat). It later evolved into the present-day provinces of Papua and West Papua.

UN administrators
The United Nations mission (UNTEA) was initially led by José Rolz-Bennett of Guatemala and then by Djalal Abdoh of Iran who served as the Administrator. In addition to civil administration, UNTEA also had a peacekeeping role through military observers.

Postal history
Nineteen postage stamps, as well as some postal stationery items, were issued by UNTEA. These were created by overprinting existing stocks of Dutch New Guinea issues.  At the time packets of all stamps were sold at UN Headquarters by the United Nations Postal Administration and they remain readily available on the retail market.

See also

List of territories governed by the United Nations
Western New Guinea
Republic of West Papua

References

External links
 Official UNTEA / UNSF website
Records of the United Nations Temporary Executive Authority in West Irian (UNTEA) (1962-1963) at the United Nations Archives
Time Magazine October/1962
Papuan self-determination - historical roots XI
Papuan self-determination - historical roots XII
UNTEA and UNRWI: United Nations Involvement in West New Guinea During the 1960s

1963 disestablishments in Asia
Indonesian New Guinea
Indonesian New Guinea
Guided Democracy in Indonesia
History of Western New Guinea
Organizations based in Netherlands New Guinea
States and territories established in 1962
1962 establishments in Asia
States and territories disestablished in 1963